Michael Boireau (born July 24, 1978) is a former American football defensive tackle of the National Football League. He was drafted by the Minnesota Vikings in the second round of the 2000 NFL Draft, and played there for two seasons. He played college football at Miami. Boireau had a rare neuromuscular disorder called ocular myasthenia gravis.

References

1978 births
Living people
American football defensive tackles
Miami Hurricanes football players
Minnesota Vikings players